A pier is a raised walkway over water, supported by widely spread piles or pillars.

Pier or PIER may also refer to:


People with the name
 Pier (given name)
 Ford Pier (born 1970), Canadian singer-songwriter
 Harriet Hamilton Pier (1872–before 1945), American lawyer
 Róber Pier (born 1995), Spanish footballer

Acronym
 Pacific Island Ecosystems at Risk (PIER), a sub-website of the 1997–2012 Hawaiian Ecosystems at Risk project (HEAR)
 Percutaneous intentional extraluminal revascularization, a procedure in interventional radiology
 Progress in Electromagnetics Research, a peer-reviewed open access scientific journal
 Policing Institute for the Eastern Region, part of Anglia Ruskin University, England

Other uses
 Pier (architecture), an upright support used in buildings or set between two spans of a bridge
 The Pier, a 2011 Irish romantic drama film

See also
 Piers (disambiguation)
 San Pier (disambiguation)